Alin Roșu (born 21 August 1989) is a Romanian handballer who plays for Steaua București and the Romania national team.

Achievements 
Liga Națională: 
Silver Medalist: 2017, 2018
Cupa României: 
Third Place: 2017

Individual awards 
All-Star Left Wing of the Liga Națională: 2018

References

1989 births
Living people 
Sportspeople from Botoșani
Romanian male handball players 
CSA Steaua București (handball) players
21st-century Romanian people